Al Aaliya Island is an island located off the coast of the municipality of Al Daayen in Qatar, north of The Pearl.

It is a small, low-lying island, of a brown colour, with a little peak at its east end, lying 3½ miles north of Al Safliya Island; it is visible 6 or 7 miles. Between these two islands is the artificial island of The Pearl, which was built in the late 2000s. In the past its eastern peak was useful as a mark entering the Al Bidda harbour.

See also
 List of islands of Qatar

References

Al Daayen
Islands of Qatar